is a Japanese actor. He is signed with Ken-On.

Career 
Ryusei was scouted on his way to a hair salon on Takeshita Street in Harajuku in the summer of 2009, and officially joined Ken-On in January 2010. In April 2010 he made his acting debut as a student of Tsukiko Mizuno who played the character Juri Ueno in 素直になれなくて (I Can't Be Obedient) which was broadcast on Fuji TV. In February 2012, he starred in Studio Life's performance of "OZ" making his stage debut. In March 2012, he made his film debut in ライアーゲーム -再生- (Liar Game -Rebirth-).

He made his TV drama debut as Daigo Kiryu/Kyoryu Red in the 37th Super Sentai series Zyuden Sentai Kyoryuger which was broadcast from February 2013 to February 2014. Though uncredited, he also played the role of Takeshi Iwaizumi in the same work. He made his movie debut in "Theatrical Version Zyuden Sentai Kyoryuger Gabrincho of Music". He appeared at MTV VMAJ 2014 on June 14, 2014, as a guest celebrity presenter at the awards ceremony. He also participated for the first time in the stage "MEN ON STYLE" featuring Ken-On's rookie actors.

In January 2016, he appeared in "Yohji Yamamoto HOMME 2016-2017AW Paris Collection", making his debut at the Paris Collection. In 2017, he made his second appearance at the Paris Collection with the "Y-3 Fall/Winter 2017-2018 Collection".

In 2017, he appeared in the serial TV novel Hiyokko, receiving attention for his appearance as "Small Giant". Since then, he has appeared in Unnatural, Showa Genroku Rakugo Shinju, and Maison de Police. In 2018, he starred in the drama Konda Teru's Legal Recipe. In 2019, he starred in the TV drama Metropolitan Suisho! ~Reiwa~. In the Japanese dub of Toy Story 4, released in July 2014, he dubbed Forky, a handmade toy made from a broken spoon.

Personal life 
His parents are from Yamagata Prefecture, and he was born in Shinjo City, Yamagata Prefecture. He is 183 cm tall, and his blood type is A. His hobbies include soccer and basketball, and his specialty is the high jump. He played soccer from elementary school to his third year of junior high school. Additionally, Mana Iwabuchi was his teammate at the time. 

Before being scouted, Ryusei wanted to be a pastry chef and train in France. When he appeared at Paris Fashion Week in 2016, he said he was happy to come to France, albeit in a different way, which was his dream.

He is a fan of the TV drama Beach Boys, and the reason he signed with Ken-On is because Takashi Sorimachi and Yutaka Takenouchi, who starred in the work, were signed with the company, and he had a feeling that he might be able to meet them.

Toshiyuki Nakano, the producer of his debut drama I Can't Be Obedient, praised his adaptability as an actor and his speed in getting used to the atmosphere. Ryusei evaluated how he is getting better, saying, "I think it's probably because I have good intuition as an actor.

In Kyoryuger, Ryusei said that he enjoyed being able to have various experiences even in the dangerous action scenes and was happy when the director told him to shoot without using stunt doubles. He cites the scene where he was lying in the water in winter as the only difficult shooting.

Filmography

TV series

Film

Japanese dub

References

External links
  
 Ken-On agency profile 

21st-century Japanese male actors
1993 births
Living people
Ken-On artists